The following elections occurred in the year 1887.

 1887 Avon by-election
 1887 Liberian general election
 1887 New Zealand general election

North America

Canada
 1887 Canadian federal election

United States
 1887 New York state election
 United States Senate election in New York, 1887

Europe
 1887 Danish Folketing election
 1887 Dutch general election
 1887 German federal election
 1887 Portuguese legislative election

United Kingdom
 1887 Dulwich by-election

See also
 :Category:1887 elections

1887
Elections